Clementi Cecil Delgado better known as Saco Delgado (1930-1997), was a Hong Kong international lawn and indoor bowler.

Bowls career
Delgado was born in Hong Kong in 1930 to Portuguese parents and was an accountant before he started bowling in 1958. He won the Hong Kong lawn bowls championship ten times before winning the rinks/fours gold medal at the 1970 British Commonwealth Games in Edinburgh.

He won the gold medal in the pairs with Eric Liddell at the 1972 World Outdoor Bowls Championship in Worthing in addition to a bronze medal in the fours event. In 1978 he won another gold medal in the men's pairs with Liddell at the 1978 Commonwealth Games.

Personal life
He was a banking official by trade.  He became a US citizen in 1984.

References

1930 births
1997 deaths
Bowls World Champions
Hong Kong male bowls players
Commonwealth Games gold medallists for Hong Kong
Bowls players at the 1978 Commonwealth Games
Bowls players at the 1970 British Commonwealth Games
Commonwealth Games medallists in lawn bowls
Medallists at the 1970 British Commonwealth Games
Medallists at the 1978 Commonwealth Games